Marko Levishyn (born 31 Augsut 2000) is an international speedway rider from the Ukraine.

Speedway career 
Levishyn came to prominence when he reached the finals of the 2019 Individual Speedway Junior European Championship and the 2020 Individual Speedway Junior European Championship. From 2019 to 2022 he was selected by the Ukraine national speedway team for the Speedway of Nations (speedway's World Cup). During 2022 he rode for Wilki Krosno in the Ekstraliga.

In 2023, he was selected as one of the reserves for the 2023 Speedway Grand Prix.

References 

Living people
2000 births
Ukrainian speedway riders
People from Rivne